Don Saunders is an Australian former professional rugby league footballer who played in the 1990s.

Background
Saunders played his junior rugby league for the Toowoomba All Whites. His nephew, Tom Dearden, is a professional rugby league player for the Brisbane Broncos.

Playing career
In Round 10 of the 1994 NSWRL season, Saunders made his first grade debut for the Gold Coast Seagulls, coming off the bench in their 12–30 loss to the South Sydney Rabbitohs at the Sydney Football Stadium. It was his only appearance for the club.

In 1996, Saunders played for the Toowoomba Clydesdales in the inaugural season of the Queensland Cup. On 31 August 1996, he captained the Clydesdales in their 8–6 Grand Final win over the Redcliffe Dolphins.

In 1997, Saunders joined the South Queensland Crushers, playing 13 games for the club that season.

In 1998, he returned to the Clydesdales, playing three more seasons at the club. In 2004, he played for the Central Comets.

Post-playing career
Following his retirement, Saunders taught and coached at Mackay State High School and Palm Beach Currumbin State High School. In 2010, he was on the coaching staff for the Gold Coast Titans NRL Under-20s team.

References

Living people
Australian rugby league players
Gold Coast Chargers players
South Queensland Crushers players
Toowoomba Clydesdales players
Central Queensland Capras players
Rugby league locks
Rugby league centres
Rugby league five-eighths
Year of birth missing (living people)